The Marquesan swiftlet (Aerodramus ocistus) is a species of swift in the family Apodidae.  It is endemic to French Polynesia.  Its natural habitat is subtropical or tropical moist lowland forests.

References

Marquesan swiftlet
Birds of the Marquesas Islands
Marquesan swiftlet
Marquesan swiftlet
Taxonomy articles created by Polbot
Endemic birds of French Polynesia
Taxobox binomials not recognized by IUCN